Li Fei (born 14 January 1973) is a Chinese rower.

Li was born in 1973 in China. At the 1991 World Rowing Championships, she won gold with the lightweight women's four. At the 1992 World Rowing Championships, she came ninth in the lightweight women's double sculls. At the 1993 World Rowing Championships, she won a silver medal in the lightweight women's double sculls. At the 1994 World Rowing Championships, she won bronze with the lightweight women's four. She competed in lightweight single sculls in the 1995 World Rowing Championships and came twelfth. She then went to the 1996 Summer Olympics in Atlanta, USA, where she competed in the women's lightweight double sculls, where she came ninth partnered with Ou Shaoyan.

References

Chinese female rowers
1973 births
Rowers at the 1996 Summer Olympics
World Rowing Championships medalists for China
Living people
Olympic rowers of China
20th-century Chinese women
21st-century Chinese women